Paavola is a former municipality of Finland, now a village in the municipality of Siikajoki. The village is located beside the Siikajoki river. Though lacking rail transport connections, the settlement does lie beside the crossroads of routes 86 and 807.

In 1973, Paavola was consolidated with the neighboring municipality of Revonlahti to form the municipality of Ruukki. Ruukki in turn was consolidated with Siikajoki in 2007.

Geography 
The municipality of Paavola bordered Revonlahti, Liminka, Rantsila, Vihanti and Pattijoki.

Villages 
Lappi
Luohua
Pehkola (Paavolan kirkonkylä)
Ruukki

History 
The name of Paavola is derived from the name of Paavo Laurinpoika, who established a farm in the area in the 1550s. Paavola was a part of the Siikajoki parish, becoming a chapel community in 1811 and a separate parish in 1874.

Paavola and Revonlahti united in 1973 to form Ruukki, which was consolidated with Siikajoki in 2007.

Picture Gallery

References

External links

Former municipalities of Finland
Siikajoki
Villages in Finland